The 2021–22 Polish Cup was the 68th season of the annual Polish football knockout tournament. It began on 4 August 2021 with the first matches of the preliminary round and ended with the final on 2 May 2022 at Stadion Narodowy. The 2021–22 edition of the Polish Cup was sponsored by Fortuna, making the official name Fortuna Puchar Polski. Winners of the competition qualified for the qualifying round of the 2022–23 UEFA Europa Conference League.

The defending champions were Raków Częstochowa. Raków successfully defended their title by defeating Lech Poznań 3–1 in the final.

Participating teams

Prize money
The PZPN Board of Directors determined the size of the prizes.

Round and draw dates

Preliminary round
The matches were played on 4 August 2021. Participating in this round were the 10 lowest ranked teams from 2020–21 II liga (which finished 2020–21 season on positions 10-19). With reference to the competition regulations, the matches were played according to the following scheme: 10th team of 2020–21 season will be a host of match against 19th team, 11th team will be a host of match against 18th team, 12th team will be a host of match against 17th team, 13th team will be a host of match against 16th team and 14th team will be a host of match against 15th team.

! colspan="5" style="background:cornsilk;"|4 August 2021

|}

Round of 64
The draw for this round was conducted in the headquarter of PZPN on 12 August 2021. The matches were played from 21 to 29 September 2021. Participating in this round were the 5 winners from the previous round, 16 teams from the 2020–21 Ekstraklasa, 18 teams from the 2020–21 I liga, 9 highest ranked teams from 2020–21 II liga and 16 winners of the regional cup competitions. Games were hosted by teams playing in the lower division in the 2021–22 season or by first drawn team in a case of match between clubs from the same division.

! colspan="3" style="background:cornsilk;"|21 September 2021

|-
! colspan="3" style="background:cornsilk;"|22 September 2021

|-
! colspan="3" style="background:cornsilk;"|23 September 2021

|-
! colspan="3" style="background:cornsilk;"|28 September 2021

|-
! colspan="3" style="background:cornsilk;"|29 September 2021

|}

Round of 32
The draw for this round was conducted in the headquarter of PZPN on 1 October 2021. The matches were played from 26 October to 3 November 2021. Participating in this round were the 32 winners from the previous round. Games were hosted by teams playing in the lower division in the 2021–22 season or by first drawn team in a case of match between clubs from the same division.

! colspan="3" style="background:cornsilk;"|26 October 2021

|-
! colspan="3" style="background:cornsilk;"|27 October 2021

|-
! colspan="3" style="background:cornsilk;"|28 October 2021

|-
! colspan="3" style="background:cornsilk;"|2 November 2021

|-
! colspan="3" style="background:cornsilk;"|3 November 2021

|}

Round of 16
The draw for this round was conducted in the headquarter of PZPN on 5 November 2021. The matches will be played from 30 November to 2 December 2021. Participating in this round are the 16 winners from the previous round. Games will be hosted by teams playing in the lower division in the 2021–22 season or by first drawn team in a case of match between clubs from the same division.

! colspan="3" style="background:cornsilk;"|30 November 2021

|-
! colspan="3" style="background:cornsilk;"|1 December 2021

|-
! colspan="3" style="background:cornsilk;"|2 December 2021

|-
! colspan="3" style="background:cornsilk;"|9 February 2022

|}

Quarter-finals
The draw for this round was conducted in the headquarter of PZPN on 3 December 2021. The matches will be played in March 2022. Participating in this round are the 8 winners from the previous round. Games will be hosted by teams playing in the lower division in the 2021–22 season or by first drawn team in a case of match between clubs from the same division.

! colspan="3" style="background:cornsilk;"|1 March 2022

|-
! colspan="3" style="background:cornsilk;"|2 March 2022

|}

Semi-finals
Participating in this round will be the 4 winners from the previous round.

! colspan="3" style="background:cornsilk;"|5 April 2022

|-
! colspan="3" style="background:cornsilk;"|6 April 2022

|}

Final

Notes

References

Polish Cup
Cup
Polish Cup seasons